Yevhen Pisotskyi (born 22 April 1987 in Zaporizhzhia, Ukrainian SSR) is a Ukrainian midfielder who plays for Metalurh Zaporizhzhia.

Career
Pisotskyi began playing football for the youth sides of FC Metalurh Zaporizhzhya. He joined the senior side, and scored his first Ukrainian Premier League goal in March 2010.

References

External links

1987 births
Living people
Ukrainian footballers
FC Metalurh Zaporizhzhia players
FC Metalurh-2 Zaporizhzhia players
FC Vorskla Poltava players
FC Mariupol players
Ukrainian Premier League players
Ukrainian expatriate footballers
Expatriate footballers in Moldova
Ukrainian expatriate sportspeople in Moldova
CSF Bălți players
Association football midfielders
Footballers from Zaporizhzhia